DSQ is an initialism used to abbreviate:
 Disability Studies Quarterly, the magazine of the Society for Disability Studies

It may also refer to:
 Donald Sinta Quartet, a saxophone quartet at the University of Michigan 
 the file extension for Corel QUERY files
 the language code for Dawsahak, a language of Mali
 DSQ software, founded in 1992 in India
 an abbreviation for disqualified in sports